This article is a list of events in the year 2018 in Senegal.

Incumbents
 President: Macky Sall 
 Prime Minister: Mohammed Dionne

Events

January
January 6 - 13 people are killed by gunmen in Casamance's Ziguinchor.
December 6 — Museum of Black Civilisations opens in Dakar after a $34m (£27m) Chinese investment.

References

 
2010s in Senegal
Years of the 21st century in Senegal
Senegal
Senegal